Howard Williams is a British political scientist and Honorary Distinguished Professor at Cardiff University. He is known for his works on German philosophy.

Howard Williams was appointed Honorary Distinguished Professor at Cardiff University in 2014. He is also Emeritus Professor in Political Theory at the Department of International Politics, Aberystwyth University, and member of the Coleg Cymraeg Cenedlaethol (Welsh language national college).

He has been visiting professor, Department of Philosophy, Halle University, Germany, 1998-9; visiting scholar, Dept of Philosophy, Wilfrid Laurier, University, Waterloo, Ontario, Canada 1998; Visiting DAAD Fellow, Humboldt University, Berlin, 2002; Visiting Professor, Krakow University 2006. In 2004 and 2006 he was a visiting scholar at the Department of Philosophy, Stanford University. In 2010 he gave the Paton lectures at the Department of Philosophy, St. Andrews University and was a principal guest speaker at the 30th Anniversary conference of the Danish Philosophical Forum. In June 2014 he was a visiting scholar at the University of Oslo contributing to a joint project of the Philosophy and Law Departments on International Courts and International Legal Theory.

He has been commissioned by Oxford University Press to write a book on the Kantian Legacy in Political Philosophy in a series edited by Paul Guyer at Brown University, Rhode Island.

His latest publications include:

'Kantian Underpinnings for a Theory of Multirights'  Kantian Theory and Human Rights, edited by Andreas Follesdal and Reidar Maliks, Routledge, New York and London, 2014

'Natural Right in Hobbes and Kant' Hobbes Studies Brill, Leiden/Boston, 2012

'The Torture Convention, Rendition and Kant’s critique of pseudo-politics' Review of International Studies Vol 36, No. 1, January 2010

'Is Just War theory merely for sorry comforters', Annual Review of Law and Ethics, Volume 17

'Kantian Perspectives on Intervention: Transcending rather than Rejecting Hobbes' International Political Theory after Hobbes (eds. Raia Prohokvik & Gabrielle Slomp) (2011)

Howard Williams was interviewed by Richard Marshall regarding Kant in Syria.

Books
 Marx (1980)
 Kant's Political Philosophy (1983)
 Concepts of Ideology (1988)
 International Relations in Political Theory (1992)
 Essays on Kant’s Political Philosophy	(ed.) (1992) 
 Hegel, Heraclitus and Marx’s Dialectic
 International Relations and the Limits of Political Theory (1996)
 Kant’s Critique of Hobbes: Sovereignty and Cosmopolitanism (2003)
 Kant and the end of War (2012)

JOURNAL EDITOR
 Kantian Review (with Richard Aquila) and the cooperation of the Kant Society of the United Kingdom and the North American Kant Society.

References

Philosophy academics
Living people
Political philosophers
Hegel scholars
Academics of Cardiff University
21st-century British philosophers
1950 births